Emotional Oranges is an American R&B/pop group from Los Angeles, California.

History
The group formed in 2017 in Los Angeles, California when "A", an audio engineer for Drake, and "V", a vocal coach for Adele, met at a bat mitzvah in 2017.

The group's members use pseudonyms and not their real names. "A" explains that: 

The group released its first single, "Motion", on May 4, 2018, on SoundCloud. It was used as the theme song of RuPaul's Drag Race 2018.

On May 10, 2019, the group released its first studio album, The Juice: Vol. I. On November 8, 2019, the group released its second studio album, The Juice: Vol. II. Both albums were released through Avant Garden Records and Island Records.

Emotional Oranges have said to have been influenced by The Weeknd, The xx, Lauryn Hill, and Matty from The 1975.

The group are currently managed by Rory Farrell, the co-host of New Rory & MAL.

Career
On May 10, 2019, the group released its long-awaited first project, The Juice: Vol. I. Off the back of this release, Emotional Oranges sold out its first headline run, called The Chill, Baby Chill tour. Playing a sold-out El Rey Theatre in Los Angeles and the Music Hall of Williamsburg in Brooklyn, the group headed to Europe for shows in London, Paris and Amsterdam with only eight songs out. Leading up to the release of its second project, Emotional Oranges went back on the road for A Very Emotional Tour with support from Avant Garden labelmates Chiiild. This tour took them to Tokyo, Australia, New Zealand, all across the U.S. and Canada, selling out  The Fonda and Brooklyn Steel, and then back to Europe.

The duo released its debut album, The Juice Vol. I, to critical acclaim in May, which dives into the complexities of the male vs. female relationship through blunt lyricism and honeyed, late-'90s-inspired production. The drop created almost instant buzz, with fans flocking to the duo's sold-out shows and social media direct messages.

Emotional Oranges has kept its members' identities secret, while building hype around a handful of singles, all of which were released over the course of the last year or so. Despite their anonymity, they communicate with fans directly every day, most often via Instagram message, engaging in dialogue with the "citrus squad," as they refer to their followers.

They performed "Personal" and "Your Best Friend Is A Hater" for VEVO's DSCVR Program ahead of their release.

At the end of this tour on November 8, 2019, the group released their second project, The Juice, Vol. II. Both projects were released through Avant Garden Records and Island Records.

On October 13, 2020, the group released the song "All That" with Channel Tres from their EP Juicebox. They later released the second single, "Bonafide", with experimental band Chiiild on January 13, 2021. On April 13, 2021, the group released the single "Down to Miami" ft. Becky G. On June 11, 2021, their third project, The Juicebox, released featuring the previous four singles as well as features from Vince Staples, THEY., Yendry, and Kiana Ledé.

The duo announced on August 30, 2022, their plan to return to Australia and New Zealand for The Sad Fruit Tour, with the Metro Theatre in Sydney, Max Watts in Melbourne, The Triffid in Brisbane and the Powerstation in Auckland on the itinerary. All performances took place in October 2022.

Discography

Studio albums

Singles

References

External links
 

Island Records artists
2017 establishments in California
Bands with fictional stage personas
American contemporary R&B musical groups
American pop music groups
American neo soul singers
Musical groups established in 2017
Musical groups from Los Angeles